Víctor Manuel Ruiz Limones (born 7 December 1957) is a Mexican weightlifter. He competed in the men's middle heavyweight event at the 1980 Summer Olympics.

Major results

References

1957 births
Living people
People from Piedras Negras, Coahuila
Mexican male weightlifters
Olympic weightlifters of Mexico
Weightlifters at the 1980 Summer Olympics
Central American and Caribbean Games medalists in weightlifting
20th-century Mexican people